The 1969 Blue Swords was an international senior-level figure skating competition organized in Karl-Marx-Stadt, East Germany. Medals were awarded in the disciplines of men's singles, ladies' singles, pair skating, and ice dancing. East Germany's Günter Zöller won his fourth consecutive Blue Swords title, defeating the Soviet Union's Vladimir Kovalev and teammate Jan Hoffmann. East Germans swept the ladies' podium, led by Sonja Morgenstern.

Soviet duo Lyudmila Smirnova / Andrei Suraikin outscored Manuela Groß / Uwe Kagelmann for gold in the pairs' event. In the ice  dancing category, future Olympic champions Lyudmila Pakhomova / Alexander Gorshkov won their third straight Blue Swords title. It was the last edition of the event that included ice dancing, prior to the 1990s.

Results

Men

Ladies

Pairs

Ice dancing

References

Blue Swords
Blue Swords